Shakir Muhammad Kamel Al-Faham (1921 – 29 June 2008) was a Syrian researcher and writer who served as a government minister in the 1960s and 1970s. He was Minister of Higher Education from 1970 to 1976.

References 

1921 births
2008 deaths
Ambassadors of Syria to Algeria

Members of the People's Assembly of Syria
20th-century Syrian writers
Syrian ministers higher of education
Syrian ministers of education
20th-century Syrian politicians
People from Homs Governorate